Tomáš Gavlák (born 15 September 1985 in Čadca) is a Slovak football forward. Gavlák played one match for Zlín in the 2007–08 Gambrinus liga. He went on to FK Bodva Moldava nad Bodvou where he was the top scorer for two consecutive seasons., although the club stopped playing in the second tier after the 2011–12 Slovak Second Football League. In 2011, he headed to Czech 2. liga club FK Fotbal Třinec, where he played for a season until Třinec's relegation in 2012.

References

External links

at fkmoldava.sk
at fotbalportal.cz

1985 births
Living people
Association football forwards
Slovak footballers
FC Fastav Zlín players
FK Bodva Moldava nad Bodvou players
Slovak Super Liga players
Czech First League players
People from Čadca
Sportspeople from the Žilina Region
FK Fotbal Třinec players